Raymond Frederick Berres (August 31, 1907 – February 1, 2007) was an American professional baseball catcher and pitching coach. He played in Major League Baseball (MLB) for the Brooklyn Dodgers, Pittsburgh Pirates, Boston Bees / Braves and New York Giants.

Born in Kenosha, Wisconsin, Berres was a  170-lb, light-hitting catcher who, thanks to his fine glove, managed to play in 11 major league seasons for four National League teams, usually in a backup role. He provided fine catching, quality game-calling, and a respectable throwing arm.

He returned to the minor leagues in 1935, but became Brooklyn's starting catcher when López was traded to Boston in December 1935. His most productive season came as a  rookie, when he posted career highs in batting average (.240), hits (64) and doubles (10). The Pittsburgh Pirates, short of catching, acquired him a year later.

On June 14, 1940, Pittsburgh traded Berres to the Boston Bees in exchange for López, and he played for 1 seasons with Boston's National League franchise. In , with the renamed Braves, Berres appeared in a career-high 120 games while hitting .201 (56-for-279); he also led the NL in fielding percentage with a .995 mark. In an 11-season career, Berres was a .216 hitter with three home runs and 78 runs batted in in 561 games played.

After serving as a bullpen catcher for the  Boston Braves and a coach for the 1948 Triple-A Milwaukee Brewers, Berres was the pitching coach for the Chicago White Sox for nearly two decades (from  through , then from the midseason of  through ), primarily under manager López. During that time, he was a member of the  American League champions.

Tommy John pitched for Berres in the coach's last years with the White Sox. "With the White Sox, I became a pitcher," John recalled. "The key to my success was pitching coach Ray Berres. I just didn't know what I was doing as a pitcher until he got me. Berres didn't teach pitches. He didn't show you how to throw the slider, forkball, screwball, or split-fingered fastball. But he had a tremendous understanding of pitching." Berres would study pitcher's mechanics and let them know adjustments which needed to be made. According to John, Berres's theory was that "the slower and more easy your motion, the more of an optical illusion it becomes to the batter when the ball gets released."

Berres died in his hometown of Kenosha, Wisconsin from pneumonia at the age of 99. He was elected to the Wisconsin Athletic Hall of Fame in 1999.

References

External links

Interview with Ray Berres
Baseball Almanac
Retrosheet
Encyclopedia of Baseball Catchers
1959 Chicago White Sox
Ex-Sox pitching coach Berres dies

1907 births
2007 deaths
Baseball coaches from Wisconsin
Baseball players from Wisconsin
Birmingham Barons players
Boston Bees players
Boston Braves players
Brooklyn Dodgers players
Chicago White Sox coaches
Chicago White Sox scouts
Deaths from pneumonia in Wisconsin
Louisville Colonels (minor league) players
Major League Baseball bullpen catchers
Major League Baseball catchers
Major League Baseball pitching coaches
Montgomery Lions players
New York Giants (NL) players
Pittsburgh Pirates players
Richmond Colts players
Sacramento Senators players
Sportspeople from the Chicago metropolitan area
Sportspeople from Kenosha, Wisconsin
Waterloo Hawks (baseball) players